Addu Atoll, also known as Seenu Atoll, is the southernmost atoll of the Maldives. Addu Atoll, together with Fuvahmulah, located 40 km north of Addu Atoll, extend the Maldives into the Southern Hemisphere. Addu Atoll is located 540 km south of Malé, the country's capital. Administratively, Addu Atoll is the location of Addu City, one of the four cities of the Maldives. Addu City consists of the inhabited areas of Addu Atoll, namely the natural islands of Hulhudhoo, Meedhoo, Maradhoo, Feydhoo, and Hithadhoo. (The districts of Addu City are not according to the natural islands that it comprises). In addition to the areas that are included as a part of Addu City, Addu Atoll has a number of other inhabited and uninhabited islands, including the island of Gan, where Gan International Airport is located.

Geography 

Unlike other atolls of the Maldives, Addu Atoll has a lagoon that is a natural anchorage, accessible through four natural channels. This results in a natural harbour that is very calm and safe for sea vessels at all times and is not affected by seasonal changes.  The four channels are arranged around the atoll as follows: the Kuda channel and the nearby Maa channel are on the north, the Gan channel is on the south, and the broad Villingili channel is on the southeast.

The islands are protected from the storms and high waves of the Indian Ocean by barrier reefs. Coconut palms, the national tree, are able to grow almost everywhere on the islands of Addu Atoll. There are small lakes, wetlands, and marshy taro fields that are unique to Addu Atoll.

History 
During the Second World War, Addu Atoll was the site of a secret Royal Navy base called HMS Haitan, to take advantage of the deep anchorage and sheltered natural harbour there. Oil tanks and storage facilities were built on Gan island, together with an airstrip and a flying boat base. The base remained unknown to the Axis throughout the early years of the war.
In 1957 the base was transferred to the Royal Air Force as RAF Gan, before being closed down in 1975. The island is now the site of Gan International Airport.

Biology 
The cosmopolitan white tern ("dhondheeni") is found in the Maldives only on Addu Atoll and is seen as a symbol of the islands. Addu Atoll also possesses particularly rich whale and dolphin fauna. A great diversity of species has been found there. Addu Atoll is the only area in the Maldives that was not affected by the 1998 global coral bleaching. The south of the Maldives was spared from the "too warm" major ocean currents of (El Niño).

Inhabited islands 
 See Meedhoo
 See Hulhudhoo
 See Hithadhoo
 See Maradhoo
 See Maradhoo-Feydhoo
 See Feydhoo

Uninhabited islands 

 Aboohera
 Bodu Hajara
 Boduheragandu
 Dhigihera
 Fahikedeherangada
 Gan (Location of Gan International Airport)
 Gaukendi
 Geskalhuhera
 Hankede Hajara
 Here-there (Location of Canareef Island Resort)
 Hikahera
 Kafathalhaa Hera
 Kandu Huraa
 Kedevaahera
 Koahera
 Kuda Kandihereganda
 Maahera
 Maamendhoo
 Madihera
 Mulikede
 Savaaheli
 Vashahera
 Villingili (Location of Shangri-La Resort)

Linguistics 
The dialect spoken is called "Addu bas", and though it has similarities to the "Mulaku bas" of Fuvahmulah, it is somewhat different from the official form of the Dhivehi language. Traditionally, Addu bas was widely spoken amongst the educated masses of three different atolls in the south, who adopted it as their lingua franca. It has also been credited with being the most famous and widespread single dialect in the Republic of Maldives. However, when Addu declared independence and recognized itself as the United Suvadive Republic, the Malé language rather than Addu bas was used in official correspondence. Nevertheless, despite the difference in dialects, the written version is common throughout the Maldives.

Culture 
Long ago Addu City was ruled by families appointed by the sultans in Malé, and may have had a matrilineal system of inheritance; it is very much a man's world today. There was a recent period in Addu history when the status quo changed for a while, when a more matriarchal society developed and women became the breadwinners.

Addu Atoll has some of the earliest known settlements recorded in the country—specifically, on the island of Meedhoo in the far north of the atoll.

References

Bibliography

External links 

 
 https://www.youtube.com/playlist?list=PLYTjyn6fVp5jSqXeDQCmWfNDQGAZ3lK3D The Atoll recreated in Cities: Skylines by a Youtuber. name, Strictoaster

 
Atolls of the Maldives